Clermont, Quebec may refer to:
Clermont, Capitale-Nationale, Quebec, in Charlevoix-Est Regional County Municipality
Clermont, Abitibi-Témiscamingue, Quebec, in Abitibi-Ouest Regional County Municipality